Nobby is a diminutive form of the name Norbert or a nickname.

Nobby, Nobby's, Nobbys or Nobbie may also refer to:

Places

Antarctic 

Nobby Nunatak, Trinity Peninsula, Antarctica
Nobby (Antarctica), a rock near South Georgia Island

Australia

New South Wales 

Nobbys Beach, a beach in the suburb of Newcastle East, New South Wales, part of greater Newcastle
Nobbys Head, a headland at Newcastle
Nobbys Tuff, a geologic formation near Newcastle
Nobbys Creek, New South Wales, a town in northern New South Wales

Queensland 

 Nobby, Queensland, a town in the Toowoomba Region

South Australia 
Nobby Islet, a small island in South Australia

Other uses
 Nobbie Dzinzi, a politician elected in the Zimbabwean parliamentary election, 2000
Nobby (boat), a fishing boat
 Nobby, a strip in the comics Buzz

See also
Noddy (disambiguation)